Multyfarnham GAA is a Gaelic Athletic Association club based in the village of Multyfarnham in the north of County Westmeath. They are current holders of the Westmeath Junior Championship. They won the 2017 Westmeath Junior Championship, and subsequently won the 2017 Leinster Junior Club Football Championship before being runners-up in the 2018 All-Ireland Junior Club Football Championship, losing the final to Knocknagree of Cork.

Notable players
Ronan Wallace, Tailteann Cup winner

Achievements
 Leinster Junior Club Football Championship (1) 2017
 Westmeath Junior Club Football Championship (3) 1956, 2017, 2022 runners-up (2) 2014, 2015

References

Gaelic games clubs in County Westmeath